Kilimogo Productions is bicultural theatre collective based in Ōtepoti Dunedin that was founded in 1995 or 1996.

Background 
The founders of Kilimogo Productions include Rangimoana Taylor, Cindy Diver and Hilary Halba. The intention was to look at theatre from both a Māori and Pākehā perspective. Founding member Taylor says of this in an interview with Halba, "I sometimes think we go quite painfully, as equals, but we discuss everything."

Productions

Ngā Tangata Toa 
Nga Tangata Toa (1997) by Hone Kouka. The play started with the Māori ritual of a karanga and haka pōwhiri blurring reality for the audience with this experience that bring a host group and a visitor group together and many in the audience would have experienced in different settings, overall the structure of the play was formed with the framework of a meeting on a marae.

Whaea Kairau 
Two years after presenting Nga Tangata Toa Kilimogo presented Rangimoana Taylor’s brothers play, Whaea Kairau: Mother Hundred-Eater (July 1999) by Apirana Taylor at the Otago Museum. This play references Brecht's play Mother Courage and Her Children. In Apirina's re-telling the central character is an Irish women in New Zealand during battles and war at the beginning of settler colonisation starting in the 1840s.

References 

Arts organizations established in 1996
Theatre companies in New Zealand